Tipula stigmatella is a species of cranefly.

Distribution
West Palaearctic.

References

 

Tipulidae
Diptera of Europe
Insects described in 1833